The Sheep Ranch Fortified House, near Arock, Oregon, is a historic structure that was built in approximately 1863. Also known as the McWilliams House, it was built by a man with the McWilliams family name. It served as a ranch house, a stagecoach stop, and a fort.

It was listed on the National Register of Historic Places in 1974.

It was bought in 1914 by Pascual Eiguren, a Basque immigrant, whose family continued to own it in 1974, and it is partly notable for its Basque association.

References 

Basque-American culture in Oregon
Houses on the National Register of Historic Places in Oregon
Houses completed in 1863
Malheur County, Oregon
National Register of Historic Places in Malheur County, Oregon
1863 establishments in Oregon